Joe Martin's Late Show is an Australian television series that aired in early 1959 on TCN-9. The short-lived series was a variety show with music and comedy. Regulars on the series included Joe Martin, Babs McKinnon, Marie Tysoe, Isador Goodman, William Palmer, and Alec Kellaway.

Reception
The Australian Women's Weekly called it "smooth and well produced, but Martin, who really is a funny man, seemed to be rather inhibited by the demands and structures of TV" and  that "old trouper Alec Kellaway and that young one Roger Climpson stole the show from him completely whenever they appeared".

References

External links
Joe Martin's Late Show on IMDb

1959 Australian television series debuts
1959 Australian television series endings
Black-and-white Australian television shows
English-language television shows
Australian variety television shows
Australian live television series